Alaçık or Alacık is a village in the Tunceli District, Tunceli Province, Turkey. The village is populated by Kurds of the Abasan tribe and had a population of 37 in 2021.

The hamlets of Bilgili, Evceğız, Gökağaç, Kanatlı, Karagöl, Köklüce, Ortanca, Sağlık, Subaşı, Yanık, Yapracık, Yazıcık and Ziyaret are attached to the village.

References 

Villages in Tunceli District
Kurdish settlements in Tunceli Province